The Job is an American reality competition television series that aired on CBS from February 8 to February 15, 2013 at 8:00 pm Eastern/7:00 pm Central. Hosted by Lisa Ling, the series featured contestants competing in various challenges for a chance to win "a dream job at their dream company".

A pilot order for The Job was placed in March 2012 and the series was picked up in May for an expected midseason debut. Michael Davies and Mark Burnett served as executive producers. The series was canceled after two episodes aired.

Episodes

References

External links

2010s American reality television series
2013 American television series debuts
2013 American television series endings
CBS original programming
English-language television shows
Television series by Sony Pictures Television